Gracilibacillus massiliensis is a moderately halophilic, Gram-positive, non-spore-forming and motile bacterium from the genus of Gracilibacillus.

References

Bacillaceae
Bacteria described in 2017